Devil Say I, I Say AIR is Portugal. The Man's second EP. It was also the second release in 2006, this digital release followed the band's first full-length released on Fearless Records. This CD contains two brand new tracks, a previously released track and a remix by Blake Beatz.

Track listing

References

Portugal. The Man albums
2006 EPs